George Gordon was a Scottish merchant and wealthy landowner who owned the  Gordon's Rock Creek Plantation on land that eventually became part of Washington, D.C.  In the 1740s, Gordon built an inspection house for tobacco on the plantation.

Knave's Disappointment, part of his landholdings, was surveyed in 1752 as a possible site for George Town (now Georgetown). Maryland offered Gordon two lots in the town, along with the "price of condemnation" (remuneration).  Gordon accepted two lots (number 48 and 52).  Maryland paid a total of 280 pounds to acquire the land from Gordon, along with land owned by George Beall.

References

History of Washington, D.C.
Scottish landowners
People of colonial Maryland
Date of birth missing
Date of death missing
Scottish emigrants to the Thirteen Colonies
Colonial American merchants
18th-century American businesspeople
18th-century Scottish businesspeople